The 2020 Sporting Kansas City II season is the club's first year under the new name of Sporting Kansas City II, fifth year of play and their second season in the Eastern Conference of the USL Championship, the top tier of United Soccer League. The second tier of the United States Soccer Pyramid. The team will continue play at Children's Mercy Park.

The season was suspended on March 12, for 30 days, due to the coronavirus pandemic. Following that decision, on March 18 the USL extended its temporary suspension until May 10.

Current roster

Player movement

In

Out

Loans 
Per Major League Soccer and club policies terms of the deals do not get disclosed.

In

Competitions

Preseason
Kickoff times are in CST (UTC-06) unless shown otherwise

Preseason schedule announced on January 24, 2020.

USL is back Friendlies

USL Championship

Results summary

Results by matchday

Table
Group E

Matches

U.S. Open Cup 

Due to their ownership by a higher division professional club (Sporting Kansas City), SKC II is one of 15 teams expressly forbidden from entering the Cup competition.

Player statistics

Squad appearances and goals

Last updated on March 10, 2020.

|-
! colspan="14" style="background:#dcdcdc; text-align:center"|Goalkeepers

|-
! colspan="14" style="background:#dcdcdc; text-align:center"|Defenders

|-
! colspan="14" style="background:#dcdcdc; text-align:center"|Midfielders

|-
! colspan="14" style="background:#dcdcdc; text-align:center"|Forwards

|-
! colspan=14 style=background:#dcdcdc; text-align:center| Players who have made an appearance or had a squad number this season but have left the club
|-
|}

References

Sporting Kansas City II
Sporting Kansas City II
Sporting Kansas City II seasons
Sporting Kansas City II